Salonga may refer to:

Places
 Fort Salonga, New York, United States
 Fort Salonga, an archeological site within the above-mentioned hamlet
 Salonga National Park, a national park in the Democratic Republic of the Congo

People
 Gerard Salonga (born 1973), Filipino orchestral conductor, musical arranger and orchestrator
 Jovito Salonga (1920–2016), Filipino nationalist politician and lawyer
 Lea Salonga (born 1971), Filipina singer, actress, and columnist
 Lea Salonga (album), the eponymous album by the aforementioned singer
 Nicasio Salonga (1924–1951), better known as Asiong Salonga, Filipino gangster also known as the “Manila Kingpin”
 Unique Salonga (born 2000), known mononymously as Unique, Filipino musician